Kuruvadweep or Kuruva Island is a  protected river delta. It comprises three densely wooded uninhabited islands and a few submergible satellite islands, which lies on the banks of the tributaries of Kabini River in the Wayanad district, Kerala, India. It is uninhabited island, which is home to rare species of birds, orchids, herbal plants etc.

These islands consists of dense and evergreen forest that is uninhabited and hence home to rare kinds of flora and fauna: endemic species of birds, orchids and herbs namely. Its unique geographical characteristics make it a place where not only the leaves but also silence is evergreen. Its 16.7 km from the nearest town itself and thus it has become a place of attraction. Recently, it has been named as the most visited place in the district by tourists from all over the globe.

The island surrounded by streams and river is accessible by rafts or fiber boats run by Kerala Tourism Department. Entrance to the island is restricted and monitored by the Forest Department of Kerala, initiative to protect forest. Due to the sheer number of elephants and other animals in the island, a pass has to be obtained prior to the visit, from Dept of Forest is mandatory. The best time to visit Kuruvadeep is from mid-December to late April. Resorts in Wayanad, near Kuruva Island, are filled during this time.  Kuruvadweep is usually closed to the public from May last to early December, due to the monsoons. The torrential rainfall floods the streams and the water level rises dangerously high.

Kuruva Islands is 17 km east of Mananthavady and 10 km north west of Pulpally, nearby towns in Wayanad District. More details can be sought in district office of Department of Tourism, Wayanad in Kalpetta. The island is located very close to the state border of Karnataka.

Gallery

References

External links

Islands of Kerala
River deltas of Asia
Tourism in Kerala
Geography of Wayanad district
Tourist attractions in Wayanad district
Islands of India
Uninhabited islands of India